Daniel O'Neill (1612 in Castlereagh – 24 October 1664 in Whitehall) was an Irish army officer, politician, courtier and postmaster general. He was part of the O'Neill Dynasty of Ulster, the nephew of Owen Roe O'Neill and the great-nephew of Hugh O'Neill, Earl of Tyrone.

Early life
O'Neill was the eldest son of Con Mac Niall O'Neill, lord of Clandeboye and his wife, Eilis (a paternal niece of Hugh O'Neill, 2nd Earl of Tyrone). The date, and even the year of his birth is unknown. A monument on his tomb, erected by his step-son, reads: "He died A.D. 1663 aged 60", suggesting he was born in 1602 or 1603. The historian Donal F. Cregan points out that the inscription can not be relied upon, as it lists the wrong year for his death. A pamphlet from the First English Civil War described him as being around 30 in 1642, while in 1616 one of his younger brothers was described as being around four or five, suggesting he was born anywhere between 1602 and 1612. In all, O'Neill had three younger siblings: two brothers; Aodh Buidhe and Con Og, and one sister; Catherine.

His father lost land after defeat at the Siege of Kinsale, leaving O'Neill to inherit a small estate at a young age in 1619. He then became a ward of Chancery and was raised in England as an Anglican. His estate was later given to The 1st Viscount Montgomery and O'Neill and his brother were granted an annuity.

Army service

Plotting and imprisonment

Royalist cause
Fleeing to Brussels, O'Neill gathered troops and arms for the royalist campaigns in the English Civil War. Formally, his first position in the royalist army was that of a major in Colonel Osborne's 14th regiment of foot, but as an experienced cavalry officer, he transferred to serve under Prince Rupert of the Rhine, the royalist cavalry general. His part association with the Palatinate family gave him good standing with the prince, who appointed him as a lieutenant colonel, commanding his own cavalry regiment. Early on in the war, he fought busily at the Battle of Powick Bridge, and later at Edgehill. He was sent to relieve Reading in 1643, but the force was repelled, and during the retreat was shot in the thigh. He subsequently fought at Chalgrove Field, where he killed the Parliamentarian standard bearer, regaining honours for his regiment they had lost at the Battle of Hopton Heath. He also later fought at the First Battle of Newbury. After failing to secure negotiations in the Irish Confederate Wars, O'Neill went on to serve as a spy to the de jure Charles II at The Hague.

The Restoration
In September 1660, O'Neill married Katherine Stanhope, Countess of Chesterfield becoming her third husband.

At The Restoration the post office was farmed for £21,500 to Henry Bishop for seven years . Bishop surrendered the balance of his lease to O'Neill having been accused of abuses. O'Neill was appointed Postmaster General of the United Kingdom in 1663, a position he held for just one year until his death. He had a monopoly on the carrying of letters and had an obligation to search out unauthorised carriers. The Court realised that farming the post was a good investment even though the rates and routes had to be adhered to. A proclamation was made that none but O'Neale (sic) were permitted to carry or deliver letters and postmasters had, upon pain of dismissal, to provide a certificate of conformity from the Church of England within six months.

Appointments
 Groom of the Chamber 1644–49, 1661–64

Death

O'Neill died on 24 October 1664 whereupon his wife Katherine Stanhope, retained his postmastership. Along with O'Neill, upon her death she was also interred in the parish church of Boughton Malherbe, Kent.

References

Sources
 
 
 

1610s births
1664 deaths
Members of the pre-1707 English Parliament for constituencies in Cornwall
Cavaliers
United Kingdom Postmasters General
Year of birth uncertain
English MPs 1661–1679
People from County Down
Irish soldiers
17th-century Irish politicians
O'Neill dynasty
Royal Horse Guards officers